Ilya Ivashka was the defending champion but chose not to defend his title.

Oscar Otte won the title after defeating Maxime Cressy 7–6(7–5), 6–4 in the final.

Seeds

Draw

Finals

Top half

Bottom half

References

External links
Main draw
Qualifying draw

Sparkassen ATP Challenger - 1
2021 Singles